Colin Wilson (1931–2013) is a British writer.

Colin Wilson may also refer to:
 Colin James Wilson (1922–1993), New Zealand musician, singer, songwriter and railway worker
 Colin St John Wilson (1922–2007), British architect, lecturer and author
 Colin J. N. Wilson, volcanologist at the Victoria University of Wellington New Zealand
 Colin Wilson (Australian footballer) (born 1933), Australian rules footballer
 Colin Wilson (comics) (born 1949), New Zealand comic book artist
 Colin Wilson (boxer) (born 1972), Australian boxer
 Colin Wilson (ice hockey) (born 1989), American retired ice hockey player
 Colin Wilson (Scottish footballer) (born 1993), Scottish footballer
 Colin Wilson (film producer), American film producer
 Colin Wilson (rugby), Scottish rugby league international and rugby union player